Lubsza may refer to:

 Lubsza (river), a river in Poland
 Lubsza, Opole Voivodeship (south-west Poland)
 Lubsza, Silesian Voivodeship (south Poland)